Epsilon is General Motors' mid-size front-wheel drive automobile platform. The architecture was multi-division project of GM North America, Opel and Saab, and debuted in the 2002 Opel Vectra and 2003 Saab 9-3. Since this platform falls squarely in the center of the worldwide automobile market, GM plans to produce a great many Epsilon vehicles with over a dozen variations. , it was GM's highest volume worldwide platform. Even after the dissolution of the GM/Fiat partnership, both companies retain the rights to continue developing Epsilon-derived models.

A total of 16 different models have made use of the GM Epsilon platform, some of which remain in production 19 years after the platform debuted.

Features

GM's Epsilon platform replaced the N platform in the US, and replaced the GM2900 platform elsewhere. Vehicles of this platform generally carry the symbol "Z" in the fourth digit of their VINs.

When the platform debuted, there was talk of an "Epsilon Wide" derivative, which was supposed to have provided the underpinnings for the Buick LaCrosse and Saab 9-5. However, the program was cancelled and the LaCrosse was put on the W platform, and the 9-5 was given a quick refresh for the 2006 model year. 
 
The Epsilon platform is a midsize front-driver promising a 200 percent improvement in rigidity, with aluminum suspension components—MacPherson struts in front and a four-link independent arrangement in the rear, and four-wheel disc brakes. Many of the Epsilon vehicles use the Ecotec Inline-four engines and both the High Value and High Feature V6 engines.

The refreshed 2008 SAAB 9-3 debuted with an advanced version of all-wheel-drive it dubbed XWD, finally giving a definitive answer to rumors about the platform's ability to support AWD, which had been around since the debut of the platform.

The Lambda and Theta Premium crossover platforms are derived from Epsilon.

Vehicles
Vehicles based on the Epsilon I platform:
 Regular
 2002–2009 Opel Vectra C saloon and liftback
 2002–2009 Vauxhall Vectra saloon and liftback
 2002–2009 Holden Vectra
 2002–2009 Chevrolet Vectra
 2003–2011 Saab 9-3
 2010–2012 Saab 9-5
 2004–2007 Chevrolet Malibu
 2006–2009 Cadillac BLS

 Extended
 2002–2009 Opel Vectra C Caravan
 2002–2009 Vauxhall Vectra Caravan
 2003–2008 Opel Signum
 2004–2007 Chevrolet Malibu Maxx hatchback
 2008–2012 Chevrolet Malibu
 2005–2010 Pontiac G6
 2005–2011 Fiat Croma
 2007–2010 Saturn Aura

Cancelled vehicles which would have used this platform:
 2006 midsized Buick

Epsilon II
A new version of the Epsilon, dubbed Epsilon II, debuted in 2008. It is adaptable for front and all-wheel drive applications. In long wheelbase format, Epsilon II supports US EPA Large Cars, allowing GM to replace the G and W platforms. The architecture was developed by Opel in Rüsselsheim, Germany. Many safety features and AWD fitment modifications were done by Saab.

Current and announced vehicles built on Epsilon II:
 SWB 
 2008–2017 Opel Insignia, Vauxhall Insignia, Holden Insignia VXR, Buick Regal, Chevrolet Vectra (saloon, hatchback, estate) (SWB)
 2012–2016 Chevrolet Malibu, Holden Malibu (SWB)
 SL LWB 
 2010–2016 Buick LaCrosse/Alpheon (SL LWB)
 2010–2012 Saab 9-5 (SL LWB)
 2012–present Roewe 950 (SL LWB)
 EL LWB
 2012–2019 Cadillac XTS (EL LWB)
 2014–2019 Chevrolet Impala (EL LWB)

Concept vehicles built on Epsilon II:
 2007 Buick Riviera
 2007 Opel GTC Concept

E2XX

E2XX is a moderately updated version of Epsilon 2 platform, consistent with other platform revamps, such as the D2XX based on Delta II.

The E2XX platform targets weight reductions and longer wheelbases.

Vehicles

Vehicle built on E2XX:
 2016–present Chevrolet Malibu
 2017–2022 Opel/Vauxhall Insignia, Buick Regal 2018–present (since 2020 China only), Holden Commodore (ZB) 2018–2020 
 2019–present Cadillac XT4
 2021–present Buick Envision

P2XX
P2XX is the longer variant of the E2XX platform.

Vehicle built on P2XX:
 Buick LaCrosse

C1XX
C1XX is the crossover variant of the E2XX platform, replacing the Theta Premium and Lambda platforms.

Vehicles built on C1XX:

Two-row mid-size:

 2017–present Cadillac XT5
 2019–present Chevrolet Blazer

Three-row mid-size:

 2017–present GMC Acadia
 2018-2020 Holden Acadia
 2020–present Buick Enclave (China)
 2020–present Chevrolet Blazer (China)
 2020–present Cadillac XT6

Full-size:
 2018–present Buick Enclave
 2018–present Chevrolet Traverse

Footnotes

References
 
 

Epsilon